Earthshaker! is a 1985 adventure module for the Dungeons & Dragons roleplaying game.  Its associated code is CM4 and the TSR product number is TSR 9128.

Plot summary
Earthshaker! is an adventure scenario in which the player characters try to maintain rule over a dukedom, and must stop organized groups from taking control of a gigantic mechanical humanoid from inside of it.

The player characters are charged with the responsibility of stewardship over the barony of Vyolstagrad while the baron must attend the king's court. The matters are already difficult with internal and external problems, but then a strange carnival appears with a hugely tremendous exhibition: A colossal humanoid machine of iron, called the Earthshaker. While the machine itself poses no threat, a band of unscrupulous villains seek to attain control over this iron titan, and only the player characters stand in their way.

Publication history

Earthshaker! was written by David "Zeb" Cook, with a cover by Clyde Caldwell, and was published by TSR in 1985 as a 24-page booklet with an outer folder.

Reception

Credits
David "Zeb" Cook: Design
Steve Winter: Editing
Clyde Caldwell: Cover art
Ben Otero: Interior art
David S. "Diesel" LaForce: Cartography
Kim N. Lindau: Typesetting
Ruth Hoyer: Art direction

See also
 List of Dungeons & Dragons modules

Further reading
Review: The V.I.P. of Gaming Magazine #2 (1986)

References

External links
Earthshaker! entry from Pen-paper.net
The "CM" modules from The Acaeum

Dungeons & Dragons modules
Mystara
Role-playing game supplements introduced in 1985